Mark Pistel is a producer, engineer, programmer, remixer and songwriter who has been working in the electronic music scene since 1988.

Pistel works out of a San Francisco recording studio called Room 5.

Pistel was a founding member of the band Consolidated, and has contributed to recordings as varied as artists such as Until December, Meat Beat Manifesto, Tino Corp., Latin Soul Syndicate, The Disposable Heroes of Hiphoprisy, MC 900 Foot Jesus, Machines of Loving Grace, ledenhed, BlackMahal, Hector Zazou and Grace Jones.  He was also lead guitarist and producer for the San Francisco rock band Hot Mute in the early to mid-2000s.

References 

American record producers
Living people
American electronic musicians
Meat Beat Manifesto members
Consolidated (band) members
Hercules and Love Affair members
Year of birth missing (living people)